Xestia scropulana is a species of cutworm or dart moth in the family Noctuidae.

The MONA or Hodges number for Xestia scropulana is 10938.

References

Further reading

 
 
 

Xestia
Articles created by Qbugbot
Moths described in 1874